Deuterocopus socotranus is a moth of the family Pterophoridae. It is found from India and Sri Lanka to Taiwan and Japan and through south-east Asia to New Guinea and Australia, where it is found from Townsville to Brisbane in Queensland. It is also present in Africa (including Nigeria and Malawi), Oman and Yemen.

The wingspan is about 20 mm. The wings are orange, with multiple lobes.

Larvae have been recorded on Vitis lanata, Vitis quadrangularis, Vitis quinquangularis  and Cayratia trifolia.

References

External links
Moths of Australia
Australian Insects
Japanese Moths
Pterophoridae from Nigeria
Trin Wiki

Moths of Australia
Deuterocopinae
Moths of Asia
Moths of Japan
Fauna of Somalia
Invertebrates of the Arabian Peninsula
Moths of Africa
Moths described in 1907